Events in the year 1928 in Norway.

Incumbents
Monarch – Haakon VII

Events

 27 June – The opening of the underground railway line to Nationaltheatret station in Oslo .
 At Herøya, outside Porsgrunn, Norsk Hydro establishes what is to become Norway's largest industrial park.
  The city of Fredrikshald changed its name to Halden.
 Municipal and county elections are held throughout the country.

Popular culture

Sports

Bernt Evensen, speed skater, Olympic gold medallist and racing cyclist, is awarded the Egebergs Ærespris for his achievements in speed skating and cycling.

Music

Film

Literature
 Sigrid Undset was awarded the Nobel Prize for Literature.

Notable births

8 January – Bab Christensen, actress (died 2017)
25 January – Rolf Nilssen, politician (died 2012)
3 February – Kjell Magne Fredheim, politician (died 2006)
7 February – Sonja Ludvigsen, politician and Minister (died 1974)
10 February – Sissel Sellæg, actress (died 2014)
23 February – Bjørn Unneberg, politician (died 2020)
24 February – Per Lønning, bishop, theologian, professor and politician (died 2016)
29 February – Anders Myklebust, politician
18 March – Hans Bjørnstad, ski jumper and World Champion (died 2007)
25 March – Roald Aas, speed skater and Olympic gold medallist and cyclist (died 2012)
9 April – Erling Norvik, politician (died 1998)
10 April – Berit Ås, politician, professor of social psychology and feminist.
14 April – Juul Bjerke, economist (died 2014)
14 April – Egil Monn-Iversen, composer (died 2017)
20 April – Svein Døvle Larssen, newspaper editor (died 2015)
6 May – Per J. Husabø, politician (died 2012)
10 May – Bjørg Løhner Øien, figure skater (died 2015).
17 May – Dag Skogheim teacher, poet, novelist, short story writer, biographer and non-fiction writer (died 2015).
19 May – Arvid Nyberg, politician (died 2022)
21 May – Inge Johansen, electrical engineer (died 2018)
28 May – Grethe Werner, sportswoman (died 2014).
29 May – Harald Hennum, international soccer player (died 1993)
26 June – Olav Haukvik, politician and Minister (died 1992)
1 July – Andreas Aarflot, theologian, bishop emeritus in the Church of Norway
27 July – Bill Johansen, ice hockey player in Canada (died 2001)
28 July – Tove Billington Bye, politician (died 2008)
4 August – Helge Høva, politician (died 2010)
10 August 
Per Asplin, actor (died 1996)
Haagen Ringnes, journalist and author (died 2008)
15 August 
Inger Koppernæs, politician and Minister (died 1990)
Fritz Røed, sculptor (died 2002)
17 August – Arnt Gudleik Hagen, politician (died 2007)
23 August – Tor Stokke, actor (died 2003)
4 September – Tor Arneberg, sailor and Olympic silver medallist (died 2015)
14 September – Astrid Gjertsen, politician and Minister.
15 September – Brikt Jensen, writer, editor, literary manager, professor and television producer (died 2011)
21 September – Liv Aasen, politician (died 2005)
25 September – Kirsten Myklevoll, politician and Minister (died 1996)
27 September – Kjell Bohlin, politician (died 2011)
29 September – Johan Kleppe, politician and Minister
5 October – Charles Philipson, judge and civil servant (died 1990).
13 October – Arnulf Olsen, politician
20 October – Kjell Egil Eimhjellen, microbiologist
23 October – Jan Frøystein Halvorsen, judge (died 2016)
7 November – Roald Åsmund Bye, politician (died 2003)
8 November – Odd Langholm, economist and historian of economic thought
19 November – Reidar Birkeland, veterinarian
24 November – Arne Langeland, jurist, civil servant and diplomat
1 December – Arild Andresen, soccer and ice hockey player (died 2008)
3 December – Karin Bang, poet, novelist, children's writer and crime writer (died 2017).
5 December – Leif Ottersen, priest (died 2017)
16 December – Bjørn Haug, judge (died 2020)
22 December – Arne Øien, economist, politician and Minister (died 1998)
29 December – Marit Øiseth, sprinter and cross country skier (died 1971)

Full date unknown
Helge Barstad, politician (died 2012)

Notable deaths

16 January – Bjarne Solberg, physician and politician (born 1877)
18 January – Nordahl Rolfsen, writer, educationalist and teacher, journalist, translator and speaker (born 1848)
21 January – Nikolai Astrup, painter (born 1880)
7 February – Herman Johan Foss Reimers, politician and Minister (born 1843)
9 February – Anna Bugge, feminist (born 1862)
27 April – Amund B. Larsen, linguist (born 1849)
17 June – Torgrim Castberg, violinist (born 1874)
6 June – Sverre Hassel, polar explorer (born 1876)
June – Roald Amundsen, polar explorer, led the first Antarctic expedition to reach the South Pole (born 1872)
14 July – August Geelmuyden Spørck, politician and Minister (born 1851)
10 October – Karl Lous, barrister (born 1847).
11 September – Per Klingenberg Hestetun, politician (born 1877)
1 December – Gunnar Knudsen, politician and twice Prime Minister of Norway (born 1848)
29 December – Eilif Peterssen, painter (born 1852)

Full date unknown
Hartvig Sverdrup Eckhoff, architect (born 1855)

See also

References

External links